Lieutenant General Sir Thomas Evans CB (9 March 1776 – 11 February 1863) was a British Army officer.

Military career
Evans was born the son of a Wolverhampton Inn Keeper. He had lost both of his parents by age 16, and promptly decided to embark on a career as a soldier.  He served in the British Army from 1793 to 1838, fighting in the French Revolutionary Wars and the Napoleonic Wars. As a major and aide-de-camp to Major General Isaac Brock, he served in Canada during the War of 1812 against the United States. 

Before the Battle of Queenston Heights, he attempted to facilitate a prisoner trade on 12 October. After he was repeatedly told that no trade could be arranged until "the day after tomorrow," and noticing that several boats had been hidden along the shore, he managed to deduce that a crossing was planned for 13 October. After returning to the Canadian side, he was able to convince Brock of this, allowing the British and Canadian militaries to prepare. Evans was wounded at the Second Battle of Sacket's Harbor in New York.

After 1827 he held important posts in Ireland, Gibraltar and Malta. He later retired to Canada.

Personal life
He married Harriet Lawrence Ogden on 12 March 1810 in Montreal. The Ogdens were a prominent loyalist family in Canada. Harriet's siblings included Peter Skene Ogden and Charles Richard Ogden.

References

1776 births
1863 deaths
British Army lieutenant generals
Governors and Governors-General of Malta
British Army personnel of the War of 1812
British Army personnel of the French Revolutionary Wars
British Army personnel of the Napoleonic Wars
93rd Regiment of Foot officers
King's Regiment (Liverpool) officers
East Surrey Regiment officers